Everyone Loves Mel is a 1998 family fantasy film directed by Joey Travolta, starring Ernest Borgnine, Julie Hagerty and Greg Evigan.

Plot
Bonnie and Peter are working on their marriage while dealing with a difficult teen-aged son.  Her father takes the boys (Roger and Travis) in for the summer at his farm.  It is apparent early on that he's fighting with developers that want his land while he wants to preserve his family's legacy.  The developers had taken over a prior farm and turned it into an amusement park, something that Grandpa does not approve of.  The boys explore as children will and find their grandfather is harboring a large turtle-like creature called Mel.  Mel is a legend of local Swanson Lake and is known as Swannie to the general populace (similar to "Nessie").  The boys' adjustment to their life in the small town is helped by getting to know him.  While going around with a girl (Susie) one day, Roger (the elder boy) accidentally causes an explosion on the developer's property with his grandfather's tractor.  When the sheriff comes by to arrest Grandpa, Roger tells them he was the one who caused the wreck but they still put Grandpa in jail.  Bonnie and Peter (the boys' parents) come to stay at the farm when Grandpa is jailed.  The boys end up staging a break out for Mel from the amusement park and with the help of Susie and her brother try to get him back to the lake, setting a tiger loose and creating mayhem in the process.

Cast
 Ernest Borgnine as Grandpa
 Julie Hagerty as Bonnie 
 Greg Evigan as Peter
 Jack Scalia as Bailey Silverwood
 Bug Hall as Travis
 Josh Paddock as Roger
 Vanessa Evigan as Susie
 Paul Sampson as Matt Henderson
 George Yager as Sheriff Edgewood
 John Green as Technician (as John Green aka Marino)
 Molly Ann Lashinsky as Debbie (as Molly Lashinsky)
 Ellen Travolta as	Dr. Vogul
 Jason Evigan as Sammy
 Christopher Wanner as Joey
 Doyle McCurley as Undercover cop

References

External links

1998 films
1998 fantasy films
American fantasy films
Films about farmers
Films about turtles
1990s English-language films
1990s American films